Bechari House is a historic house in Khouzestan, Iran that dates back to Qajar era and Sheikh Khazal's rule in Khouzestan. The house is located in Abadan, Khouzestan, Iran. The building has two stories with special design, wood-works and arc architecture. It is registered as number 9968 on the Iran National Heritage List.

References

Architecture in Iran
Houses in Iran
Houses completed in the 18th century